City Market may refer to:

Finland
K-citymarket

Malta
Valletta Market, known as Is-Suq tal-Belt (City Market) in Maltese

Mexico
City Market (Mexico), a subsidiary of La Comer supermarket chain

United States
(by state)
 Ponce City Market, Atlanta, Georgia, listed on the National Register of Historic Places (NRHP)
 City Market (Savannah, Georgia)
 City Market (Indianapolis, Indiana), NRHP-listed
 City Market (Davenport, Iowa), NRHP-listed
 City Market (Lansing, Michigan)
 River Market, Kansas City, Missouri, formerly known as City Market
 City Market (Louisiana, Missouri), NRHP-listed
 City Market (Raleigh, North Carolina)
 City Market (Charleston, South Carolina), NRHP-listed as "Market Hall and Sheds"
 City Market (Petersburg, Virginia), NRHP-listed
 City Market (Madison, Wisconsin), NRHP-listed

Others:
City Market (US grocery store chain), a grocery store operating in the western United States

See also
Market House (disambiguation)